Giampaolo Urlando (born 7 January 1945, in Padova) is a retired Italian hammer thrower.

Biography
He ended up in fourth place at the 1984 Summer Olympics, but was disqualified for testosterone use.

Achievements

National titles
Giampaolo Urlando has won 10 times the individual national championship.
10 wins in Hammer throw (1967, 1975, 1976, 1977, 1978, 1979, 1980, 1981, 1982, 1983)

See also
 Italian all-time top lists - Hammer throw

References

External links
 

1945 births
Living people
Italian male hammer throwers
Athletes (track and field) at the 1976 Summer Olympics
Athletes (track and field) at the 1980 Summer Olympics
Athletes (track and field) at the 1984 Summer Olympics
Doping cases in athletics
Italian sportspeople in doping cases
Olympic athletes of Italy
Sportspeople from Padua
Male weight throwers
Mediterranean Games gold medalists for Italy
Athletes (track and field) at the 1979 Mediterranean Games
Athletes (track and field) at the 1983 Mediterranean Games
World Athletics Championships athletes for Italy
Mediterranean Games medalists in athletics